The European Association for Biometrics (EAB) is a non-profit organization in the field of biometrics with its headquarters in Bussum (Netherlands). The Association promotes the development of biometrics and its use in Europe, in general in accordance with the law, with the principles of ethics, stimulating the development of technology, increasing security and business.

Aims
The purpose of the activity is to promote the development of proper and meaningful use of biometrics from the point of view of interest of the inhabitants of European, industrial, academic, organizational and educational backgrounds.

History 
The association was founded on November 17, 2011 in Darmstadt at the Fraunhofer Institute for Computer Graphics Research. It was developed as part of the Biometric European Stakeholders Network (BEST Network) project, funded by the European Commission under the 7th Framework Program for the Scientific Conference. The EAB Statute was based on the CAST e.V. There were 14 institutions from 10 different European countries involved in the activities of the foundation. The interests of the members are represented by the Board.

Organization 
The EAB includes institutions, companies and individuals from all over Europe. In general, the EAB has more than 200 members. Association is an active network with local people in contact in most European countries. The wave cluster solidifies the structure, which represents the composition on the outside. The EAB Advisory Board, composed of senior members of the community, advises on the development of strategic issues.

In special interest groups, committees and working groups dealing with various topics, members have the opportunity to discuss current issues. The results are summarized in the documents presenting the position or in white papers and made available to the public for further discussion.

Activities 

EAB organizes several conferences, seminars and workshops. For example, the European Research Projects Conference (EAB-RPC) organized the project, which presented two projects funded by the European Commission within the framework of its current policy framework. Also trends and opportunities of biometrics in banking are discussed

In order to promote young scientists, the award funds a research award and a branch award. Outstanding doctoral theses are presented and awarded by a selected jury. EAB is active in many parts of the world, promoting innovation and developing a competitive biometrics market in Europe. The EAB is responsible for regulating the increasing interoperability of data and standards for data formatting, in compliance with ISO standards.

Together with international organizations and the authorities of European countries, the EAB is a coalition partner in promoting the establishment of the International Identity Day celebrated annually on 16 September.

The European Association for Biometrics (EAB) is hosting its European Biometric Max Snijder, Research, and Industry Awards  since 2007. These awards are granted annually to individuals who have been judged by a panel of internationally respected experts to be making a significant contribution to the field of biometrics research in Europe.

See also

 Access control
 AFIS
 AssureSign
 BioAPI
 Biometrics
 Biometrics in schools
 Fingerprint recognition
 Fuzzy extractor
 Gait analysis
 Government database
 Handwritten biometric recognition
 Identity Cards Act 2006
 International Identity Federation
 Keystroke dynamics
 Multiple Biometric Grand Challenge
 Private biometrics
 Retinal scan
 Signature recognition
 Smart city
 Speaker recognition
 Vein matching
 Voice analysis

References

External links
  European Association for Biometrics - Preliminary Contribution to Horizon 2020 Consultations on Trustworthy ICT
  Kriegsschiffe statt staatliche Seenotrettung
  Questions and answers: Gino Martini, RPS chief scientist

External links 
 

 
Information technology organizations based in Europe
Surveillance
Authentication methods
Identification
Non-profit organisations based in the Netherlands
2011 establishments in the Netherlands